GS is a trade union in Sweden representing workers in the media, forestry and woodworking industries.

History
The union was established on 1 June 2009 through the merging of Swedish Forest and Wood Workers' Union and Swedish Graphic Workers' Union.  Like both its predecessors, it affiliated to the Swedish Trade Union Confederation.  The merger was originally conceived by the Swedish Paper Workers' Union, but that union ultimately decided to remain independent.

On formation, the union had 52,845 members, but this has fallen in line with employment in the industries it covers.  By 2019, it had 37,583 members.

External links

References

Swedish Trade Union Confederation
Printing trade unions
Timber industry trade unions
Trade unions in Sweden
2009 establishments in Sweden
Trade unions established in 2009